Ronald Williams (born May 19, 1972) was a star Canadian Football League running back who played seven seasons for four teams.  Williams finished his career with 6110 yards rushing. He was named to the CFL Eastern Division All Star team in 1998. He won the 1999 Grey Cup with the Hamilton Tiger-Cats.  Williams was a stand out player at Ninety Six High School and Clemson University both in South Carolina.  He was awarded the ACC Rookie of the Year award in 1990.  He turned pro and nominated for the NFL draft in 1992, but was not selected.

References

1972 births
Living people
American football running backs
American players of Canadian football
BC Lions players
Canadian football running backs
Clemson Tigers football players
Edmonton Elks players
Hamilton Tiger-Cats players
Sportspeople from Marietta, Georgia
Rhein Fire players
Winnipeg Blue Bombers players
Players of American football from Marietta, Georgia